Tabrimmon ( Ṭaḇrīmmon), also as Tabrimon, also as Tabremon in Douay–Rheims, was an Aramaean king, but there is little known about him.  According to the Bible, he is the son of Hezion and the father of Ben-Hadad I:

See also

 List of Syrian monarchs
 Timeline of Syrian history
Aramean kings

References

10th-century BC Aramean kings